Bobby Bland and B. B. King Together Again...Live is a live album recorded in 1976 at the Coconut Grove in Los Angeles by Bobby Bland and B. B. King.

Track listing
A-side
"Let The Good Times Roll" (Sam Theard, Fleecie Moore) -- 5:40
Medley:
a) "Stormy Monday Blues" (Aaron T-Bone Walker) -- 3:00;

b) "Strange Things Happen" (Percy Mayfield) -3:58

3. "Feel So Bad" (Sam "Lightnin'" Hopkins) -- 8:22
            
B-side
1. Medley:

a) "Mother-In-Law Blues" (Don Robey) - 3:00

b) "Mean Old World" ("Little" Walter Jacobs) - 2:40

2. "Every Day (I Have The Blues)" (Peter Chatman) -- 3:58

3. Medley:

a) "The Thrill Is Gone" (Roy Hawkins, Rick Darnell) - 12:35

b) "I Ain't Gonna Be The First To Cry" (Michael Price, Dan Welsh, Mitch Bottler) -- 02:00

Personnel 
Bobby Bland, B. B. King - vocals
B. B. King, Milton Hopkins, Johnny Jones, Ray Parker - guitar
Rudy Aikels, Louis Villery - bass guitar
John "Jabo" Starks, Harold Potier - drums
James Toney - organ
Robert Anderson - piano
Red Holloway - tenor saxophone
Jerome Richardson - baritone saxophone
Oscar Brashear, Albert Aarons, Snooky Young - trumpet
Garnett Brown, Benny Powell - trombone
Viola Jackson - voice from audience on "The Thrill Is Gone"

Other credits 
Horns arranged by Johnny Pate
Principal Engineer: Barney Perkins

References

Bobby Bland albums
B.B. King live albums
1976 live albums
Albums produced by Esmond Edwards
albums arranged by Johnny Pate
Impulse! Records live albums